Coatbridge South is one of the twenty-one wards used to elect members of the North Lanarkshire Council. Covering neighbourhoods in the south-east of Coatbridge (Calderwood, Carnbroe, Greenend, Kirkshaws, Rosehall, Shawhead, Sikeside, Victoria Park and Whifflet), it currently elects four councillors. A boundary review in 2017 caused the addition of an area between Langloan Street, the A725 and the A89, with a small increase in the electorate and an additional seat from the original three. The ward had a population of 16,889 in 2019.

Councillors

Election Results

2022 Election

2017 Election

2018 By-election
On 13 August 2018, Labour councillor Gordon Encinias died, having been unwell for some time. A by-election was held on 25 October and the seat was held by Geraldine Woods of Scottish Labour.

2012 Election

2007 Election

References

Wards of North Lanarkshire
Coatbridge